Philippe Barroso (born 1 August 1955 in Pau, Pyrénées-Atlantiques) is a retired French alpine skier who competed in the 1976 Winter Olympics, finishing 25th in the giant slalom.

External links
 sports-reference.com
 

1955 births
Living people
French male alpine skiers
Olympic alpine skiers of France
Alpine skiers at the 1976 Winter Olympics
Sportspeople from Pau, Pyrénées-Atlantiques
20th-century French people